Celsius is a superhero in the DC Comics series Doom Patrol. She first appeared in Showcase #94 (September 1977), and was created by Paul Kupperberg and Joe Staton. She is among the very few superheroes of Indian heritage, and may be the first ever such hero created by DC Comics.

Celsius appeared in her first live adaptation on the first season of the Doom Patrol television series for DC Universe played by Jasmine Kaur and Madhur Jaffrey.

Background and creation
Celsius was created for the new, rebooted Doom Patrol which debuted in Showcase #94-96. Inspired by Len Wein and Dave Cockrum's "New X-Men", writer Paul Kupperberg wanted to have some heroes of different nationalities in the group. Artist Joe Staton used photos from National Geographic articles about India as the model for Celsius.

Fictional character biography
Arani Desai was born in India into a life of wealth and privilege. Her mother died while giving birth to her. She possessed an excellent intellect and athleticism. Arani ran away from home after her father went insane. Life on the streets in Calcutta made her deathly ill. She was rescued by young American Dr. Niles Caulder. He gave her immortality on their wedding and left her in the Himalayas while he tried to evade General Immortus. Arani waited and realized that the serum augmented her powerfully, so that she could control her core temperature and project quantities of heat and cold. This ability coupled with the mysticism and monastery training made her a formidable martial artist.

Doom Patrol
Discovering the death of the Doom Patrol, she creates her own team initially to search for her husband, whom she refuses to believe perished with the rest of the Doom Patrol in an explosion. Cliff Steele survived by virtue of his mechanical nature as Robotman (just enough of his body had been left intact, including his head, to keep his brain alive, and he was found by Will Magnus who built him a new form), and upon returning to Doom Patrol headquarters, finds the new team holding a meeting there. They are interrupted and captured by Immortus, who momentarily restores his youth by using the mind-probe on Arani to get the immortality formula from her. As the treatment she had been given was prepared specifically for her metabolism, it soon backfires on him.

Kalki
The Doom Patrol discovers Negative Man also survived both the explosion and the loss of his radio-energy being to Soviet defector Valentina Vostok (herself a member of the new Doom Patrol as Negative Woman), and was a hostage of Arani's now demonically controlled father Ashok Desai, renamed Kalki. Like the terrorist Kobra, Ashok believes it is his destiny to bring about the Kali Yuga. Ashok Desai had worked with Niles Caulder to develop the immortality serum. Ashok tested an early version of the mutagenic serum on himself, manipulated by Dr Niles Caulder as a part of his catastrophe curve and to secure getting the beautiful blue eyed 15 year old Arani for his young bride & vessel of the immortality serum. The failed formula of Ashok triggered his metagene, and mutated his body, driving him insane. He was transformed into a living portal to a nether dimension that he believed was "hell".

He and Caulder devised a suit of armor to contain his deteriorating body and to control the dimensional portal. Niles manipulated Arani to flee to the streets of Calcutta, only to find her later and marry her. Kalki had set up a hidden base on the island of Jamaica from which he intended to launch a satellite designed to eliminate all life on Earth. Kalki died in battle with his daughter Celsius, he taunted Arani that Niles manipulated her and that he was a pawn in his game, as they all were. Celsius' temperature blasts damaged his dimensional window, causing the "demons" on the other side of its portal to turn on him; they were then able to horrifically drag his body through to the other side.

Celsius was the only member left fighting against an evil Lord of Chaos, hand in hand with Power Girl. Her Arctic-cold blast exploded the superheated Metallo after he managed to control Robotman's actions to battle Superman. Arani later discovered that Niles Caulder was, as she had believed, still alive, and that Vostok had become a covert operative for the United States government.

Invasion

When Niles came out of hiding, he declared they were never married, although he did know her, then declared that Arani was "hopelessly insane" for believing so, although he would later retract that statement. He admitted to experimenting on her with his immortality serum. Arani was seemingly killed in a suicidal attempt to freeze a Gil'Dishpan battle cruiser from escaping the Arctic Circle during the Invasion! crossover. Celsius remained behind when she realized that the aliens were seeking to escape the surprise attack. When other Doom Patrol members begged her to get away she flatly refused, stating that "Niles knows the truth" while engulfing the rear of the ship in tons of ice. Arani realised the truth about Niles, that herself, Ashok, The Doom Patrol and many of their villains were byproducts of Niles manipulations. As the fusion engines erupted with power, the force blew back at her point blank. Aquaman realized that the backlash created by Celsius coupled with the bombs did indeed cripple the interstellar ship. Tragically, Celsius became the first heroic casualty in the invasion. The Patrol buried her remains, but the Gene Bomb went off at her funeral.

Niles Caulder later revealed that he married Arani for her own protection as a single woman in India, but that he abandoned her immediately after the ceremony.

Blackest Night
Celsius is one of four Doom Patrol members reanimated as Black Lanterns whom the Doom Patrol must deal with in the Blackest Night tie-in storyline. She confronts her ex-husband and proceeds to taunt him emotionally, then super freeze and shatter his paralyzed legs. She is prevented from killing Caulder by a man with a black hole for a face, and is sent away from Oolong island, along with her fellow Black Lanterns, via a warp gate.

The New 52 
In 2011, "The New 52" rebooted the DC Universe. Celsius first appeared along with Negative Woman and Tempest being watched by Grid. She is mentioned in a conversation by Scorch and Karma as being presumably killed off by Johnny Quick and Atomica. Lex Luthor tells Chief that she and Tempest have faked their own deaths to escape from the Doom Patrol.

In the "Watchmen" sequel "Doomsday Clock", Celsius was in India when a metahuman arms race was happening, in light of "The Superman Theory" and became the leader of The Doomed which also consists of Aalak of the Komeriah, Animal-Vegetable-Mineral Man, Aruna, Beast Girl, Maya, Solstice, and Son of Kalki.

Powers and abilities
Celsius is a superior martial artist due to her monastery training. She has minor levels of ancient mysticism taught to her due to her monastery training in the Himalayas by Buddhist monks.

These same Buddhist monks taught Arani to control and manipulate her core temperature, projecting formidable heat to a volcanic level from her left hand or intense cold and ice to an arctic level from her right hand after Niles Caulder's immortality serum triggered her metagene. Celsius was even seen to casually hold a Government helicopter aloft due to a power blast of superheated steam. She can not be seen by infra red sensors. Due to the secret longevity serum given to her by Niles Caulder instead of General Immortus, she was supposedly to remain young and beautiful forever as an immortal.

The combination of her natural athletic prowess, intelligence, martial arts and thermal duality made Celsius one of the most formidable, dynamic martial artists in the DC Universe. She now has a Black power ring because of her resurrection and can do anything a Black Lantern can do combined with her natural thermal powers.

In other media
Celsius appears in the Doom Patrol episode "Doom Patrol Patrol", portrayed by Jasmine Kaur as a young woman and by Madhur Jaffrey as an old woman. This version was a member of a 1950s incarnation of the Doom Patrol before they were defeated by Mr. Nobody and disbanded. As most of them were left mentally ill, Joshua Clay became their caretaker.

References

External links
DCU Guide: Celsius

DC Comics female superheroes
DC Comics martial artists
DC Comics metahumans
DC Comics superheroes
Indian superheroes
Fictional characters with fire or heat abilities 
Fictional characters with ice or cold abilities 
Fictional characters with slowed ageing
Fictional immigrants to the United States
Comics characters introduced in 1977
Characters created by Jim Aparo
Characters created by Paul Kupperberg